The Pârâul Boului is a right tributary of the river Moldovița in Romania. It flows into the Moldovița in Vatra Moldoviței.

References

Rivers of Romania
Rivers of Suceava County